Sarai is the name of several inhabited localities in Russia.

Urban localities
Sarai, Ryazan Oblast, a work settlement in Sarayevsky District of Ryazan Oblast

Rural localities
Sarai, Altai Krai, a selo in Stukovsky Selsoviet of Pavlovsky District of Altai Krai
Sarai, Rostov Oblast, a khutor in Azhinovskoye Rural Settlement of Bagayevsky District of Rostov Oblast